Hadero Lake is located in Thatta District, Sindh. It is an important brackish wetland, where waterfowl occur. It was declared wildlife sanctuary for the protection of migratory and resident birds.

Hadero Lake is a natural lake in a shallow depression.
It is considered one of the favourite lakes of ornithologist. Among the fauna except than fishes, waterfowl occur in large numbers and include swans, storks, cranes and feeding flocks of pelicans. Also waders and cormorants are common.

The lake was initially declared a Game Sanctuary under Section 15 of the West Pakistan Wildlife Protection Ordinance 1959 in 1971. In 1977 it was declared as Wildlife Sanctuary under a notification by Government of Sindh. At the time of declaration of the protected area local people were allowed to catch fish from lake, but do not have the right to disturb the birds in winter season. It was initially protected for shooting purpose in 1971 but keeping in view it potential and birds varieties ultimately it got the status of wildlife sanctuary. Because of its fish resources, local fishermen were allowed to catch fish for their livelihood.
The lake is owned by the Government. For regular monitoring of wetland resources, the Sindh Wildlife Department has provided a facility of residential quarters for sanctuary staff, which consists of one Sanctuary Assistant, and six Game Watchers.

See also
Hamal Lake
Haleji Lake

References

External links
 https://archive.today/20130416091642/http://www.sindhwildlife.com.pk/protectedareas/haderolake.htm

Lakes of Sindh
Thatta District
Tourist attractions in Thatta